The Saxe-Coburg and Bragança Branch constitutes one of the branches of the Brazilian Imperial Family. Having as its origin the marriage of princess Leopoldina of Brazil, with prince Ludwig August of Saxe-Coburg and Gotha.

History 
The branch originated with the wedding of the princess Leopoldina of Brazil, daughter of Pedro II of Brazil with the prince Ludwig August of Saxe-Coburg and Gotha, celebrated on 15 December 1864. A Brazil with the lineage of Saxe-Coburg and Gotha was part of the strategy of Duchess of Kent to gain more influence and offer an alliance with the country. From this union four children were born; however, only the two oldest, Peter August and  August Leopold, remained with Brazilian nationality. Peter August had no descendants and passed the headship of the branch to the descendants of his brother, who had already died when Peter August died.

August Leopold, exiled in Vienna, Austro-Hungarian Empire, married in 1894 the Archduchess Karoline Marie of Austria, granddaughter of the Grand Duke Leopold II of Tuscany. From this union, eight children were born, of which Princess Teresa Cristina (born in 1902) was the only one who remained with Brazilian nationality, as well as her children.

Teresa Cristina married in Salzburg the Baron Lamoral Taxis of Bordogna and Valnigra, based in Italy and belonging to the princely family of Thurn and Taxis. The baron allowed his children to be registered as Brazilians, so that they could remain in the line of succession of the brazilian Braganzas. This couple left as heir of their names and traditions Carlos Tasso of Saxe-Coburg and Braganza.

Among the members of this branch they would not maintain the dignity of Dom, since, by the nobility rules portuguese brazilians, such title is not transmitted through the mother, in the case of Princess Leopoldina. However, after the death of Princess Leopoldina, her first two sons, Peter August and August Leopold, were taken to Brazil to be raised as heirs to the Brazilian imperial throne, given the difficulty of imperial princess, Princess Isabel, to generate children. Princes August Leopold and Peter August began to receive the treatment of Highness and Dom, being, for all intents and purposes, Princes of Brazil. However, this condition weakened with the birth of Pedro de Alcântara, first male of Princess Isabel and Count of Eu, and his brothers.

Heads of the Saxe-Coburg and Braganza branch 

 Leopoldina of Brazil (1847–1871). Daughter of the Emperor Pedro II and the Empress Teresa Cristina.
 Prince Peter August (1871–1934). Eldest son of Leopoldine and Prince Ludwig August.
 Princess Teresa Cristina (1934–1990). Daughter of August Leopold and the Archduchess Karoline Marie of Austria-Tuscany.
 Carlos Tasso of Saxe-Coburg and Braganza (1990–). Son of Teresa Cristina and Baron Lamoral Taxis de Bordogna and Valnigra.

List of notable members

See also 

 Brazilian Imperial Family
 House of Saxe-Coburg and Gotha-Koháry

References

Citations

Bibliography 

 

Empire of Brazil
Brazilian royalty